Charlie Marshall may refer to:

 Charlie Marshall (cricketer) (born 1961), Bermudian cricketer
 Charlie "Chip" Marshall (1919–2007), American professional baseball catcher
 Charlie Marshall (rugby union) (1886–1947), British rugby union player

See also
 Charles Marshall (disambiguation)